Nelson is a surname, also used as a given name.

It is derived from a patronymic name created from the given name "Nell," or for the Irish, "Niall". The name is also listed as a baptismal name "the son of Eleanor".

Nelson is also an anglicized version of the Scandinavian names Nilsen, Nielsen, and Nilsson. Within the United States, it is ranked as the 39th-most common surname of 88799 listed.

Notable people with the surname "Nelson" include

A
A. C. Nelson (1864–1913), American educator
Adam Nelson (born 1975), American shotputter
Adolph Lincoln Nelson (1888–??), American inventor
Adolphus Peter Nelson (1872–1927), American politician
Adriana Nelson (born 1980), American long-distance runner
Adrienne Nelson (born 1967), American lawyer and judge
A. J. Nelson (born 1985), Ghanaian recording artist
Al Nelson (born 1943), American football player
Alberta Nelson (1937–2006), American actress
Aleisha Nelson (born 1990), New Zealand rugby union player
Alexis Nikole Nelson (born 1992), American chef
Alice Dunbar Nelson (1875–1935), American poet
Allison Nelson (1822–1862), American politician
Alondra Nelson (born 1968), American writer
Amy Nelson (born 1980), American lawyer
Amy K. Nelson (born 1978), American journalist
Anne Nelson (born 1954), American journalist
Antonya Nelson (born 1961), American author
Armando Melgar Nelson (born 1945), Guatemalan footballer
Arnett Nelson (1892–1959), American musician
Arvell Nelson (born 1988), American football player
Aven Nelson (1859–1952), American botanist
Avua-Siav Leo Nelson (born 1980), Russian footballer
Azumah Nelson (born 1958), Ghanaian boxer

B
Baby Face Nelson (1908–1934), American gang member
Battling Nelson (1882–1954), Danish-American boxer
Beata Nelson (born 1998), American swimmer
Bek Nelson (1927–2015), American model
Benjamin Nelson (1911–1977), American sociologist
Benny Nelson (born 1941), American football player
Bertram Nelson (1905–1984), British accountant
Beryce Nelson (born 1947), Australian politician
Billie Nelson (1941–1974), British motorcycle racer
Billy Bass Nelson (born 1951), American politician
Blake Nelson (born 1965), American author
Boycie Nelson (born 1974), New Zealand rugby league footballer
Bradley Nelson (born 1962), American robotist
Brady Nelson (born 1978), American businessman
Brendan Nelson (born 1958), Australian politician
Brett Nelson (born 1969), American musician
Brittany Nelson (born 1984), American artist
Brock Nelson (born 1991), American ice hockey player
Brooklyn Nelson (born 2004), American actress
Bryan Nelson (born 1958), American politician
Bryant Nelson (born 1974), American baseball player
Buck Nelson (1895–1982), American farmer
Byron Nelson (1912–2006), American golfer

C
Caleb Nelson (born 1966), American law professor
Caleb Azumah Nelson, British-Ghanaian writer
Camille A. Nelson (born 1968), Canadian-Jamaican law professor
Candace Nelson (born 1974), American chef
Candy Nelson (1849–1910), American baseball player
Carey Nelson (born 1963), Canadian long-distance runner
Carla Nelson (born 1957), American politician
Carly Nelson (born 1998), American soccer player
Caroline Nelson (1868–1952), Danish-American activist
Cary Nelson (born 1946), American professor
Casey Nelson (born 1992), American ice hockey player
Catherine Nelson (born 1987), Northern Irish politician
Celeste Nelson (born 1976), American scientist
Charmaine Nelson (born 1971), Canadian curator
Cindy Nelson (born 1955), American alpine skier
Cindy Nelson (actress), Australian actress
Cirilo Nelson (1938–2020), Honduran botanist
Clair Nelson (1940–2019), American politician
Cleland Kinloch Nelson (1852–1917), American bishop
Cody Nelson (born 1988), Australian rugby league player
Colette Nelson (born 1974), American bodybuilder
Colleen Nelson, Australian scientist
Conrad Nelson (born 1964), British actor
Cordner Nelson (1918–2009), American publisher
Corey Nelson (born 1992), American football player
Corky Nelson (1939–2014), American football player and coach

D
Dale Nelson (1939–1999), Canadian murderer
Dana D. Nelson (born 1962), American English professor
Darby Nelson (1940–2022), American writer and politician
Darrin Nelson (born 1959), American football player
Daryl Nelson (born 1934), Australian rules footballer
Deborah Nelson (born 1962), American journalist
Deborah L. Nelson (born 1962), American academic
DeMarcus Nelson (born 1985), Serbian-American basketball player
Derrie Nelson (born 1958), American football player
Diane Nelson (comics) (born 1968), American business executive
Dianne Nelson (born 1954), American writer
Donnie Nelson (born 1962), American basketball executive
Dorothyann Nelson, American figure skater
Douglas Nelson (born 1959), American judoka
Duke Nelson (1907–1989), American athletic administrator
Dwight Nelson (born 1952), Japanese-American pastor
Dwight Nelson (politician) (1946–2018), Jamaican politician

E
Earle Nelson (1897–1928), American serial killer
Eddie J. Nelson, American sound engineer
Edith M. Nelson (1889–1942), American librarian
Eldon Nelson (1927–2012), American jockey
Elimu Nelson (born 1973), American actor
Eliza Nelson (born 1956), Indian field hockey player
Elmer C. Nelson (1900–1975), American politician
Emily Nelson (born 1996), English cyclist
Emmett Nelson (1905–1967), American baseball player
Erich Nelson (1897–1980), German artist
Erven T. Nelson (born 1956), American lawyer and politician
Esther Nelson (1810–1843), Manx poet
Evelyn Nelson (1899–1923), American actress
Evelyn Nelson (mathematician) (1943–1987), Canadian mathematician
Everett Nelson, American baseball player

F
Frances Nelson (1758–1831), English public figure
Frances Nelson (actress) (1892–1975), American actress
Franklin Nelson (1933–2019), American figure skater
Fraser Nelson (born 1973), British journalist
Fred Nelson (1934–2018), Australian rugby league footballer
Frederick Nelson (1932–2009), American engineering professor

G
Gail S. Nelson (born 1959), American mathematician
Garnett Nelson (1872–1930), American football coach
Garry Nelson (born 1961), English footballer
Gaylord Nelson (1916–2005), American politician
Gene Nelson (1920–1996), American dancer
Gene Nelson (baseball) (born 1960), American baseball player
Gerald Nelson (born 1941), South African cricketer
Gil Nelson (born 1949), American botanist
Glen Nelson, American poet
G. Lynn Nelson (1937–2014), American author
G. M. Nelson (1899–1983), American politician
Gord Nelson (born 1947), Canadian ice hockey player
Gordon M. Nelson (1941–1993), American political activist
Graham Nelson (born 1968), British mathematician and poet
Grant Nelson (disambiguation), multiple people
Gray Nelson (1927–2022), New Zealand public servant
Gunvor Nelson (born 1931), Swedish artist
Guy Nelson (1900–1969), English cricketer
G. W. Nelson, American politician
Gwen Nelson (1901–1990), English actress

H
Hank Nelson (1937–2012), Australian historian
Harriet Nelson (1909–1994), American singer
Harris Nelson (1835–1883), Australian businessman and politician
Harvey Frans Nelson Jr. (1924–2021), American diplomat
Havelock Nelson (1917–1996), Irish composer
Havelock Nelson (writer) (born 1964), Guyanese journalist
Haywood Nelson (born 1960), American actor
H. C. Nelson (1886–1939), American politician
Helena Nelson (born 1953), Scottish poet
Herm Nelson (born 1961), American racewalker
H. G. P. Nelson (1932–2001), Sri Lankan politician
Hilaree Nelson (born 1972), American ski mountaineer
Holly Nelson, Canadian writer and activist
Horace Nelson (1878–1962), American politician
Horatia Nelson (1801–1881), British public figure
Hosea Nelson, American chemist
Hub Nelson (1907–1981), American ice hockey player

I
Ira Schreiber Nelson (1912–1965), American botanist
Irene Nelson (born 1962), Russian recording artist
Isaac Nelson (1809–1888), Irish politician and minister
Isaac De Groff Nelson (1810–1891), American politician
Ivory V. Nelson (born 1934), American educator

J
Jackson Nelson (born 1996), Australian rules footballer
Jacob Broughton Nelson (1898-19??), American fraternity founder
Jacqui Nelson (born 1965), New Zealand cyclist
Jameer Nelson (born 1982), American basketball player
Jamie Nelson (born 1959), American baseball player
Jamie Lindemann Nelson (born 1954), American philosopher
Jan Nelson (born 1955), Australian artist
Janai Nelson (born 1971), American lawyer
Jandy Nelson (born 1965), American author
Jane Nelson (born 1951), American politician
Janet Nelson (born 1942), British historian
Jason Nelson (born 1981), American poet
Jason Nelson (musician) (born 1974), American musician
Jay Nelson (born 1970), American video editor
Jayden Nelson (born 2002), Canadian soccer player
Jenny Nelson, British physics professor
Jeremiah Nelson (1769–1838), American politician
Jeremy Nelson, American visual artist
Jerry Nelson (1934–2012), American puppeteer
Jerry Nelson (astronomer) (1944–2017), American astronomer
Jesy Nelson (born 1991), British singer
Jez Nelson (born 1964), British radio broadcaster
Jill Nelson (born 1952), American journalist
J. J. Nelson (born 1992), American football player
Joan Nelson (born 1958), American visual artist
Joanna Nelson, American ecologist
Jock Nelson (1908–1991), Australian politician
Joe Nelson (born 1974), American baseball player
Joel Nelson (born 1945), American poet
Johnny Nelson (born 1967), British boxer
Jordy Nelson (born 1985), American football player
Josh Nelson (born 1978), American pianist
Josie Nelson (born 2002), English cyclist
Juanita Morrow Nelson (1923–2015), American activist
Judd Nelson (born 1959), American actor
Judith Nelson (1939–2012), American soprano
Judy Nelson, American author and social figure
Julia Bullard Nelson (1842–1914), American activist
Julia D. Nelson (1863–1936), American politician
Julio Jorge Nelson (1913–1976), Argentine musician
Justus Henry Nelson (1850–1937), American missionary

K
Karen Nelson (athlete) (born 1963), Canadian hurler
Karen E. Nelson, Jamaican-American microbiologist
Karl Nelson (born 1960), American football player
Katherine Nelson (1930–2018), American psychologist
Katherine Greacen Nelson (1913–1982), American geologist
Kay Nelson (1909–2003), American costume designer
Kemba Nelson (born 2000), Jamaican sprinter
Kemi Nelson (1956–2022), Nigerian politician
Kent C. Nelson, American businessman
Kim Nelson (1958–2015), Australian artist
Kins Nelson (born 1973), Sri Lankan politician
Kirsten Nelson (born 1970), American actress
Knuckles Nelson (born 1963), American professional wrestler
Knute Nelson (1843–1923), American politician
Kristin Nelson (1945–2018), American painter and author

L
Larry Nelson (born 1947), American golfer
Lars Nelson (born 1985), Swedish skier
Latrivia Nelson (born 1980), American novelist
Lauren Nelson (born 1986), American beauty queen
Lauritz Nelson (1860–1941), Norwegian-American sailor
Lawrie Nelson (born 1943), Australian racing driver
Lefty Nelson, American baseball player
Lemrick Nelson (born 1975), American criminal
Lennart Nelson (1918–2006), Swedish weightlifter
Leonard Nelson (1882–1927), German mathematician and philosopher
Léone Boudreau-Nelson (1915-2004), American-born Canadian phonetician
Levi B. Nelson (1838–1903), American politician
Lew A. Nelson, American test pilot
Lianne Nelson (born 1972), American rower
Lindsey Nelson (1919–1995), American sportscaster
Lisa Nelson (born 1949), American artist
Logan Nelson (born 1996), American composer
Lori Nelson (1933–2020), American actress
Louie Nelson (born 1951), American basketball player
Louis Nelson (disambiguation), multiple people
Lowell A. Nelson (1918–1986), American politician
Lyle Nelson (born 1949), American biathlete
Lynn Nelson (1905–1955), American baseball player
Lynn Nelson (runner) (born 1962), American long-distance runner

M
Madison Nelson (1803–1870), justice of the Maryland Court of Appeals
Maggie Nelson (born 1973), American writer
Marc Nelson (born 1971), American singer-songwriter
Marc Saw Nelson (born 1972), Burmese-Australian television host
Marilyn Nelson (born 1946), American author and poet
Marjorie Nelson (1923–2010), American actress
Marshall Nelson (born 1994), Australian-Belgian basketball player
Martin A. Nelson (1889–1979), American lawyer and judge
Maud Nelson (1881–1944), American baseball player
Marvin Nelson (born 1958), American politician
Maximo Nelson (born 1982), Dominican baseball player
Mel Nelson (born 1936), American baseball player
Melissa K. Nelson, American indigenous activist
Merle Nelson (born 1935), American politician
Merrill Nelson (born 1955), American politician
Mervyn Nelson (??–1991), American actor
Mickaël Nelson (born 1990), French footballer
Mikiela Nelson (born 1997), Canadian rugby union footballer
Mimi Nelson (1922–1999), Swedish actress
Morley Nelson (1916–2005), American falconer and educator
Murry R. Nelson (born 1947), American professor

N
Napoleon Nelson, American politician
Nathan Nelson (born 1938), Israeli biologist
Nathan Nelson (politician), American politician
Neal Nelson, American basketball coach
Ned Nelson (1911–1977), American baseball and basketball player
Neil Nelson, American Marine general
Nici Nelson, English anthropologist
Nicholas H. Nelson (died 1874), American politician
Niecee Nelson (born 1979), American basketball coach
Nihal Nelson (1946–2022), Sri Lankan vocalist
Nikki Nelson (born 1969), American singer
Niles Nelson (born 1938), American football coach
Nirith Nelson (born 1968), Israeli artist
N. O. Nelson (1844–1922), American businessman
Noel Nelson (born 1967), Irish cricketer
Norm Nelson (1923–1988), American stock car driver
Norman Nelson (born 1983), South African rugby union footballer
Novella Nelson (1939–2017), American actress

O
O. B. Nelson (1850–1922), Danish-American politician
Olaf Frederick Nelson (1883–1944), Samoan businessman and politician
Olive Nelson (1911–1970), Samoan barrister
Oliver Nelson (1932–1975), American jazz musician
Omaima Nelson (born 1968), Egyptian-American model
Oscar Nelson (1874–1951), American politician
Oscar Frederick Nelson (1881–1951), American naval officer
Otto L. Nelson Jr. (1902–1985), American soldier
Ozzie Nelson (1906–1975), American actor

P
Packie Nelson (1907–1992), American football player
Pam Nelson (born 1946), American politician
Pamela Nelson, American artist
Paula Nelson (born 1969), American singer
Phillip Nelson (born 1929), American economic professor
Phyllis Nelson (1950–1998), American singer
Picasso Nelson (born 1973), American football player
Polly Nelson (born 1952), American attorney
Portia Nelson (1920–2001), American singer-songwriter
Prince Nelson (1958-2016),
American singer-songwriter

Q
Quenton Nelson (born 1996), American football player

R
Ralph Nelson (1916–1987), American film director
Ralph Nelson (American football) (born 1954), American football player
Raymond Nels Nelson (1921–1981), American newspaper editor
Rebecca J. Nelson (born 1961), American biologist
Red Nelson (1886–1956), American baseball player
Red Nelson (musician) (1907–1970), American singer
Reeves Nelson (born 1991), American basketball player
Reggie Nelson (born 1983), American football player
Reggie Nelson (offensive tackle) (born 1976), American football player
Reiss Nelson (born 1999), English footballer
Rensselaer Nelson (1826–1904), American judge
Reuben N. Nelson (1904–1966), American lawyer and politician
Rex Nelson, American sports broadcaster
Ricky Nelson (1940–1985), American singer-songwriter
Ricky Nelson (baseball) (1959–2021), American baseball player and manager
Riki R. Nelson, American artist
Riley Nelson (born 1977), Canadian ice hockey player
R. Kenton Nelson (born 1954), American painter
Rob Nelson (born 1979), American biologist and documentary filmmaker
Robert M. Nelson (born 1946), Canadian lawyer
Rocky Nelson (1924–2006), American baseball player
Roland Nelson (1881–1940), English barrister
Romeo Nelson (1902–1974), American pianist
Rony Nelson (born 1989), American football player
Rosemary Nelson (1958–1999), Irish human rights solicitor
Russ Nelson (born 1958), American computer scientist
Ryan D. Nelson (born 1973), American judge
Ryne Nelson (born 1998), American baseball player

S
Sa'eed Nelson (born 1998), American basketball player
Sam Nelson (1896–1963), American film director
Sammy Nelson (born 1949), Northern Ireland footballer
Samuel Nelson (1792–1873), American attorney and judge
Sandra Nelson (born 1964), American actress
Sandra Nelson (politician) (bron 1971), American politician
Sandy Nelson (1938–2022), American drummer
Sandy Nelson (footballer), Australian rules footballer
Sarah Jane Nelson, American actress
Sarah Milledge Nelson (1931–2020), American archaeologist
Scott Nelson (born 1969), New Zealand race walker
Scott Reynolds Nelson (born 1964), American history professor
SD Nelson (born 1950), American illustrator
Sean Nelson (born 1973), American singer
Sean Nelson (actor) (born 1980), American actor
Seth Iredell Nelson (1809–1905), American pioneer
Shara Nelson (born 1965), English singer-songwriter
Sharon Nelson, American politician
Shaun Nelson (born 1973), Australian politician
Sheffield Nelson (born 1941), American attorney
Sheila Nelson (1936–2020), English violin and viola teacher
Sheila Nelson (politician), American politician
Shelley Nelson, English singer-songwriter
Shiloh Nelson (born 2009), American actress
Shimona Nelson (born 1998), Jamaican netball player
Shirley Nelson (1925–2022), American author
Shirley Collie Nelson (1931–2010), American singer
Sid Nelson (born 1996), English footballer
Sidney Nelson (1800–1862), English composer
Simeon Nelson (born 1964), Australian sculptor
Simon Nelson (1931–2017), American murderer
Socrates Nelson (1814–1867), American politician and businessman
Sonny Boy Nelson (1908–1998), American musician
Sophia A. Nelson (born 1967), American journalist
Soraya Sarhaddi Nelson, American journalist
Spencer Nelson (born 1980), American-Azerbaijani basketball player
Spike Nelson (1906–1998), American football player and coach
Stace Nelson (born 1967), American politician
Stacey Nelson (born 1987), American softball player
Stan Nelson (born 1939), Canadian politician
Stanley Nelson Jr. (born 1951), American documentary filmmaker
Steady Nelson (1913–1988), American musician
Stephen Nelson (sportscaster) (born 1989), American sportscaster
Stephen L. Nelson (born 1959), American author
Steven Nelson (born 1993), American football player
Stewart Nelson, American mathematician and programmer
Stuart Nelson (born 1981), English footballer
Sue Nelson (born 1961), British writer
Susan B. Nelson (1927–2003), American environmental activist
Susan Richard Nelson (born 1952), American lawyer and judge
Syd Nelson (1932–2021), American politician

T
Tasha Nelson (born 1974), American alpine skier
Tara Nelson, Canadian television journalist
Taylor Nelson (born 1988), Canadian ice hockey player
Teddy Nelson (1939–1992), Norwegian singer
Telena Cruz Nelson (born 1980), Guamanian politician
Tex Nelson (1936–2011), American baseball player
Thérèse Nelson, American chef
Thor Nelson (born 1968), American ice hockey player
Tia Nelson (born 1956), American activist
Tori Nelson (born 1976), American boxer
Trapper Nelson (1909–1968), American trapper
Travis Nelson, American politician
Trevor Nelson (born 1964), British disc jockey
Truman J. Nelson (1911–1987), American writer
Tyka Nelson (born 1960), American singer
Tyrone Nelson (born 1985), American basketball player

V
Valentine Nelson (born 1987), Papua New Guinean footballer
Van Nelson (born 1945), American long-distance runner
Victor Folke Nelson (1898–1939), Swedish-American writer
Vinceroy Nelson (born 1996), Kittitian footballer
Violet Nelson, Canadian actress

W
Waldo Nelson (1898–1997), American pediatrician
Wallace Nelson (1856–1943), Australian politician
Wallwood Nelson (1884–??), Jamaican cricketer
Wally Nelson (1909–2002), American civil rights activist
Walter Nelson (1932–1962), American guitarist
Warren Nelson (born 1950), American entrepreneur
Wayne Nelson (born 1950), American musician
Wes Nelson (born 1998), English television personality
W. Grant Nelson (1869–1946), American politician
Wilbur Nelson (1910–2003), American radio broadcaster
Willie Nelson (born 1933), American singer
Wolfred Nelson (1791–1863), Canadian politician

Y
Yvonne Nelson (born 1985), Ghanaian actress

Z
Zach Nelson (born 1961), American business executive
Zach Nelson (screenwriter) (born 1975), American screenwriter
Zion Nelson (born 2001), American football player
Zita Nelson, Spanish-Argentine soprano

Disambiguation pages

A
Alan Nelson (disambiguation)
Albert Nelson (disambiguation)
Alex Nelson (disambiguation)
Alfred Nelson (disambiguation)
Andrew Nelson (disambiguation)
Ann Nelson (disambiguation)
Anthony Nelson (disambiguation)
Arthur Nelson (disambiguation)
Ashleigh Nelson (disambiguation)

B
Barry Nelson (disambiguation)
Ben Nelson (disambiguation)
Bert Nelson (disambiguation)
Bill Nelson (disambiguation)
Bob Nelson (disambiguation)
Bobby Nelson (disambiguation)
Brad Nelson (disambiguation)
Brian Nelson (disambiguation)
Bruce Nelson (disambiguation)

C
Candice Nelson (disambiguation)
Carl Nelson (disambiguation)
Carolyn Nelson (disambiguation)
Charles Nelson (disambiguation)
Chris Nelson (disambiguation)
Christopher Nelson (disambiguation)
Colin Nelson (disambiguation)
Craig Nelson (disambiguation)

D
Daniel Nelson (disambiguation)
Drew Nelson (disambiguation)
David Nelson (disambiguation)
Dennis Nelson (disambiguation)
Don Nelson (disambiguation)
Donna Nelson (disambiguation)
Dorothy Nelson (disambiguation)

E
Earl Nelson (disambiguation)
Ed Nelson (disambiguation)
Edmund Nelson (disambiguation)
Edward Nelson (disambiguation)
Edwin Nelson (disambiguation)
Eric Nelson (disambiguation)
Erik Nelson (disambiguation)
Ernest Nelson (disambiguation)

F
Francis Nelson (disambiguation)
Frank Nelson (disambiguation)

G
Gary Nelson (disambiguation)
George Nelson (disambiguation)
Greg Nelson (disambiguation)
Gregory Nelson (disambiguation)
Gunnar Nelson (disambiguation)

H
Harold Nelson (disambiguation)
Harry Nelson (disambiguation)
Helen Nelson (disambiguation)
Henry Nelson (disambiguation)
H. G. Nelson (disambiguation)
Homer Nelson (disambiguation)
Horatio Nelson (disambiguation)
Howard Nelson (disambiguation)
Hubert Nelson (disambiguation)
Hugh Nelson (disambiguation)

I
Ian Nelson (disambiguation)

J
Jack Nelson (disambiguation)
James Nelson (disambiguation)
Jeff Nelson (disambiguation)
Jennifer Nelson (disambiguation)
Jessica Nelson (disambiguation)
Jessie Nelson (disambiguation)
Jim Nelson (disambiguation)
Jimmy Nelson (disambiguation)
John Nelson (disambiguation)
Jon Nelson (disambiguation)
Jonathan Nelson (disambiguation)
Joseph Nelson (disambiguation)
Joshua Nelson (disambiguation)
Julie Nelson (disambiguation)

K
Keith Nelson (disambiguation)
Ken Nelson (disambiguation)
Kenneth Nelson (disambiguation)
Kyle Nelson (disambiguation)

L
Lee Nelson (disambiguation)
Luke Nelson (disambiguation)

M
Mark Nelson (disambiguation)
Martha Nelson (disambiguation)
Matt Nelson (disambiguation)
Michael Nelson (disambiguation)
Miriam Nelson (disambiguation)

N
Nels Nelson (disambiguation)
Nick Nelson (disambiguation)

P
Patrick Nelson (disambiguation)
Paul Nelson (disambiguation)
Peter Nelson (disambiguation)
Philip Nelson (disambiguation)

R
Ray Nelson (disambiguation)
Richard Nelson (disambiguation)
Robert Nelson (disambiguation)
Roger Nelson (disambiguation)
Ron Nelson (disambiguation)
Roy Nelson (disambiguation)
Russell Nelson (disambiguation)
Ruth Nelson (disambiguation)

S
Sara Nelson (disambiguation)
Shane Nelson (disambiguation)
Shawn Nelson (disambiguation)
Steve Nelson (disambiguation)

T
Ted Nelson (disambiguation)
Terry Nelson (disambiguation)
Thomas Nelson (disambiguation)
Tim Nelson (disambiguation)
Todd Nelson (disambiguation)
Tony Nelson (disambiguation)
Tracy Nelson (disambiguation)
Tyler Nelson (disambiguation)

W
Wendy Nelson (disambiguation)
William Nelson (disambiguation)

Fictional characters
Alice Nelson, a character in the show The Brady Bunch
Brody Nelson, a character in the show CSI: Cyber
Christine Nelson, a character in the Degrassi franchise
Foggy Nelson, a character in series Marvel Comics
Storm Nelson, a character in the British comic strip Eagle
Victoria "Vicki" Nelson, a character in the book Blood Price
Nick Nelson, a character in the graphic novel and Netflix show Heartstopper

See also
Nelson (given name), people with the given name "Nelson"
Neilson (name), people with the surname "Neilson"
Clan MacNeil, a family with the surname "MacNeil"
Admiral Nelson (disambiguation), a disambiguation page for Admirals surnamed "Nelson"
General Nelson (disambiguation), a disambiguation page for General surnamed "Nelson"
Governor Nelson (disambiguation), a disambiguation page for Governor surnamed "Nelson"
Judge Nelson (disambiguation), a disambiguation page for Judges surnamed "Nelson"
Justice Nelson (disambiguation), a disambiguation page for Justices surnamed "Nelson"
Lady Nelson (disambiguation), a disambiguation page for Ladies surnamed "Nelson"
Lord Nelson (disambiguation), a disambiguation page for Lords surnamed "Nelson"
Senator Nelson (disambiguation), a disambiguation page for Senators surnamed "Nelson"

References 

English-language surnames
Patronymic surnames
Surnames from given names